Marcos Baghdatis was the defending champion, but decided not participate this year.

Dudi Sela won the tournament, defeating John-Patrick Smith in the final.

Seeds

  Ričardas Berankis (first round)
  John Millman (second round)
  Ernests Gulbis (first round)
  Ruben Bemelmans (second round)
  Go Soeda (withdrew)
  Kyle Edmund (withdrew)
  Taro Daniel (second round)
  Alejandro González (first round)

Draw

Finals

Top half

Bottom half

References 
 Main Draw
 Qualifying Draw

Odlum Brown Vancouver Open
Vancouver Open